Tasmanorites is a genus of beetles in the family Carabidae, containing the following species:

 Tasmanorites aberrans Moore, 1972
 Tasmanorites austrinus (Sloane, 1920)
 Tasmanorites beatricis Eberhard & Giachino, 2011
 Tasmanorites blackburni (Sloane, 1920)
 Tasmanorites brevinotatus (Sloane, 1920)
 Tasmanorites cordicollis Moore, 1972
 Tasmanorites daccordii Eberhard & Giachino, 2011
 Tasmanorites elegans Moore, 1972
 Tasmanorites flavipes (Lea, 1910)
 Tasmanorites glaebarum Moore, 1972
 Tasmanorites grossus Moore, 1972
 Tasmanorites intermedius Moore, 1972
 Tasmanorites laticollis Moore, 1983
 Tasmanorites longinotatus (Sloane, 1920)
 Tasmanorites lynceorum Eberhard & Giachino, 2011
 Tasmanorites madidus Moore, 1972
 Tasmanorites magnus Moore, 1972
 Tasmanorites microphthalmus Eberhard & Giachino, 2011
 Tasmanorites nitens (Putzeys, 1874)
 Tasmanorites perkini Donabauer, 2001
 Tasmanorites pullus Moore, 1972
 Tasmanorites riparius Moore, 1972
 Tasmanorites tasmaniae (Blackburn, 1901)

References

Trechinae